Phorceful Ahead is an album released in 2002 by the German heavy metal-band Symphorce.

Track listing
All songs written and arranged by Franck/Dupont/Wohlbold/Pohl
 "Speak My Mind" - 4:28
 "Unbroken" - 4:52
 "Slow Down" - 4:07
 "Longing Home" - 4:44
 "Moving in Circles" - 3:54
 "Falling through Again" - 4:26
 "Your Blood, My Soul" - 5:32
 "Rage of Violence" - 6:32
 "Touched and Infected" - 3:20
 "Nothin' Left" - 5:08

The digipak version of the album contains these bonus tracks:
 "Where Night Returns" (Demo '02) 
 "Force Fed" (Demo '02) 
 "In Times of Grief" (Demo '02)

Credits
Andy B. Franck - vocals
Cedric Dupont - guitars
Markus Pohl - guitars
Dennis Wohlbold - bass guitar
Sascha Sauer - drums

2002 albums
Symphorce albums
Metal Blade Records albums